Bruce Allen may refer to:
Bruce Allen (American football) (born 1956), American football executive
Bruce Allen (manager), Canadian manager of musical artists
Bruce Allen (physicist) (born 1959), American physicist; director of the Max Planck Institute for Gravitational Physics
Bruce C. Allen (died 2009), American guitarist in The Suburbs
Bruce F. Allen (1917–1986), American politician
Bruce Allen (drag racer), American drag racer

See also

Allen (surname)